Henry Cole is an English TV presenter, producer and director. On television he is best known for World’s Greatest Motorcycle Rides, The Motorbike Show, Shed and Buried, and Find It, Fix It, Flog It. Many of these feature Allen Millyard and in the main are produced by his own production company, HCA Entertainment. Cole is also the founder and CEO of bespoke motorcycle manufacturer Gladstone Motorcycles, named after his great uncle Dick "Red Beard" Gladstone.

Early life 
Cole was born in February 1964. His great-great uncle was William Ewart Gladstone, the former Prime Minister of the United Kingdom. He was educated at Eton College, where he was a contemporary of Boris Johnson. He was a heroin addict in his late teens and early twenties, but has been clean since then.

Career 
He started as a news cameraman for channels including ITV and TF1 and progressed to making rockumentaries, primarily with heavy rock bands, then directing TV commercials, and finally directing films, such as the semi-autobiographical Mad Dogs and Englishmen with Elizabeth Hurley.

HCA Entertainment 
Founded by Cole in 1995, HCA Entertainment is an independent television production company, specialising in factual entertainment programmes that have appeared on ITV, Channel 4, Channel 5, Discovery and Quest in the UK.

World Records 
In 2013 Henry Cole set a world land speed record for a pre-1955 750cc motorcycle, riding a Brough Superior on the Bonneville Salt Flats.

Books 
Henry Cole has written two books: A Biker's Life (2018) and The Life-Changing Magic of Sheds (2020).

References

External links 
 https://henrycole.tv - Official Henry Cole website
 http://www.gladstonemotorcycles.com -  Gladstone Motorcycles website
 https://hcaentertainment.com - HCA Entertainment Ltd (about-us website)

1964 births
Living people
British television presenters
People educated at Eton College